Lower Class Crucifixion is an album by the Massachusetts-based punk rock band The Unseen, released in 1998.

Track listing
"Children of the Revolution" (Paul)  – 3:04
"Too Young to Know...Too Reckless to Care" (Mark, Scott) – 1:54
"Alone" (Tripp, Scott, Paul) – 2:03
"Social Security" (Scott, Mark) – 2:02
"Goodbye America" (Paul) – 2:55
"New World Fodder" (Paul, Scott) – 2:39
"Police Brutality" (Paul, Scott) – 1:56
"What Are We Waiting For?" (Paul) – 2:33
"Unseen Class" (Scott, Mark) – 1:21
"Coincidence or Consequence?" (Paul) – 2:18
"In the City" (Paul) – 2:19
"A.D.D." (Tripp) – 0:47
"Thorn" (Cover of Poison's "Every Rose Has Its Thorn") – 4:11

Personnel
Mark - Drums, Vocals
Paul - Guitar, Drums, Vocals, Organ
Tripp - Bass, Vocals
Scott - Guitar

References

External links
Lower Class Crucifixion @ discogs.com

The Unseen (band) albums
1997 albums
A-F Records albums